Hanne Kjoll Eilertsen (born 23 March 1999) is a Norwegian snowboarder. She competed in the 2022 Winter Olympics, in  Women's big air and Women's slopestyle.

She competed at the 2016 Winter Youth Olympics, and 2021–22 FIS Snowboard World Cup.

References

External links
 
 
 
 

1999 births
Norwegian female snowboarders
Norwegian people of Korean descent
Living people
Sportspeople from Daegu
Snowboarders at the 2022 Winter Olympics
Olympic snowboarders of Norway
Snowboarders at the 2016 Winter Youth Olympics
Norwegian adoptees
South Korean adoptees
South Korean emigrants to Norway
21st-century Norwegian women